Ranitomeya summersi, sometimes referred to as Summers' poison frog, is a species of poison dart frogs found in the central Huallaga River drainage and adjacent Cordillera Azul National Park in central Peru. Before 2008, the species was considered a subspecies of Ranitomeya fantastica. The IUCN considers it an endangered species because of limited habitat range, habitat loss, and collection for the pet trade.

They lay their eggs primarily in Dieffenbachia plants and in holes in trees.

Morphology 
Ranitomeya summersi is one of the larger species of poison dart frogs. It has an orange and black banded pattern and a large snout to vent length. Males and females exhibit no sexual dimorphism in snout to vent length, exhibiting a range from 15.5 mm to 20.4 mm. This species possesses a black marking over the eyes extending past the tympanum giving them the appearance of a mask. The species is a Batesian mimicry of Ranitomeya Variabilis. While Ranitomeya imitator can copy the appearance of R. summersi, R. summersi can be distinguished from the imitator by its soft buzz call which can only be heard less than 1 m away, and its dark mask which covers the tympanum. In contrast the Ranitomeya imitator calls are much louder and can be heard form 5 m away.

References

Ranitomeya
Endemic fauna of Peru
Amphibians of Peru
Frogs of South America
Amphibians described in 2008